Elizabeth Killigrew may refer to:
Elizabeth Trewinnard, Elizabeth Trewinnard, Lady Killigrew (before 1525 – after 1582)
Elizabeth Killigrew, Viscountess Shannon, wife of Francis Boyle, 1st Viscount Shannon and mistress of Charles II of England